Kuno Todeson (26 May 1924 – 6 May 2022) was an Estonian politician. A member of the Communist Party of the Soviet Union, he served in the Supreme Soviet of the Estonian Soviet Socialist Republic from 1967 to 1990. He died on 6 May 2022 at the age of 97.

References

1924 births
2022 deaths
Communist Party of Estonia politicians
Members of the Supreme Soviet of the Estonian Soviet Socialist Republic, 1967–1971
Members of the Supreme Soviet of the Estonian Soviet Socialist Republic, 1971–1975
Members of the Supreme Soviet of the Estonian Soviet Socialist Republic, 1975–1980
Members of the Supreme Soviet of the Estonian Soviet Socialist Republic, 1980–1985
Members of the Supreme Soviet of the Estonian Soviet Socialist Republic, 1985–1990
20th-century Estonian politicians
Politicians from Tallinn